Crock may refer to:

 Crock (comic strip), a daily comic strip that was published from 1975 to 2012
 Crock (dishware), a stoneware pot

See also
 Croc (disambiguation)
 Krock (disambiguation)
 Croque